Archdiocese of Santa Fe may refer to:

 Roman Catholic Archdiocese of Santa Fe — an archdiocese in New Mexico in the United States: established in 1850 and raised to an archdiocese in 1875
 Roman Catholic Archdiocese of Bogotá — an archdiocese in central Colombia: established in 1562 and raised to an archdiocese in 1564, and formerly known as the Diocese of Santafé en Nueva Granada and Archdiocese of Santafé en Nueva Granada until 1898
 Roman Catholic Archdiocese of Santa Fe de Antioquia — an archdiocese in northwestern Colombia: established in 1804, formerly known as the Diocese of Antioquía and the Diocese of Antioquía–Jericó, and raised to an archdiocese in 1988 
 Roman Catholic Archdiocese of Santa Fe de la Vera Cruz — an archdiocese in Argentina: established in 1897 and raised to an archdiocese in 1934, and formerly known as the Diocese of Santa Fe then the Archdiocese of Santa Fe